Juan Sebastián Cabal and Robert Farah were the defending champion but chose not to compete.
Gong Maoxin and Peng Hsien-yin won the title, beating Chen Ti and Huang Liang-chi 6–3, 6–2

Seeds

  Gong Maoxin /  Peng Hsien-yin (champions)
  Chen Ti /  Huang Liang-chi (final)
  Denys Molchanov /  Yang Tsung-hua (first round)
  Ryan Agar /  Jeevan Nedunchezhiyan (first round)

Draw

Draw

References
 Main Draw

OEC Kaohsiung - Doubles
2014 Doubles
2014 in Taiwanese tennis